The football tournament at the 2005 Islamic Solidarity Games took from 9 to 20 April 2005. Each participating nation's football association selected 21 players for the tournament.

Group A

Iran B

Oman

Sudan

Tajikistan

Group B

Chad

Mali U23
Mali taked part to the tournament with the U23 team. Some of them played too with the military team.

Coach: Mory Goïta

Syria

Group C

Algeria U21
Coach: Abdelhak Benchikha

Palestine

Saudi Arabia

Yemen

Group D

Malaysia

Morocco U21

Pakistan

References

squads
2005